Robert Henry Southwell (October 1745 – 29 August 1817), styled The Honourable from 1766, was an Irish politician.

He was the second son of Thomas Southwell, 1st Viscount Southwell and his wife Margaret Hamilton, daughter of Arthur Cecil Hamilton. Southwell served as lieutenant-colonel of the 8th Dragoons. In 1776, he entered the Irish House of Commons for Downpatrick, representing the constituency until 1783.

In 1786, he married Frideswide Moore, daughter of John Moore, and had by her a son and a daughter. Southwell died at Clontarf, Dublin.

References

1745 births
1817 deaths
Irish MPs 1776–1783
Members of the Parliament of Ireland (pre-1801) for County Down constituencies
Younger sons of viscounts